Segrave is a surname and can refer to:

Blackburn Segrave, a 1930s touring aircraft by Blackburn Aircraft
Doris Segrave (1886-1968), Lady Segrave, former actress and singer
Gilbert Segrave (1266–1316), bishop of London from 1313 to 1316, son of Nicholas, 1st Baron Segrave
Henry Segrave (1896–1930), water and land speed record holder
Hugh Segrave (died 1387), Lord Keeper of the Great Seal and Treasurer of England under Richard II of England
John de Segrave, 4th Baron Segrave (1315–1353), married, as her first husband, Margaret, Duchess of Norfolk
Lord Richard Seagrave, Duke Of Sealand (1985 - ) Lord of Hougun Manor, Duke of Sealand, Radio Presenter 
Nicholas de Segrave the younger (c. 1260 – 1322), "Lord of Stowe" and son of Nicholas, 1st Baron Segrave
Nicholas de Segrave, 1st Baron Segrave (died 1295), English baronial leader
Patrick Segrave, son of Richard (died after 1610), Irish judge who was removed from office for corruption
Richard Segrave (died 1598), Irish judge
Segrave Trophy, an award for innovations in transport named after Henry Segrave
Stephen de Segrave (1171–1241), Chief Justiciar of England

See also
Baron Segrave, a title in the Peerage of England
Segraves (disambiguation)
Seagrave (disambiguation)
Seagraves (disambiguation)